Hawick Rugby Football Club is an semi-pro rugby union side, currently playing in the Scottish Premiership and Border League. The club was founded in 1885 and are based at Mansfield Park at Hawick in the Scottish Borders.

Splinter from Hawick and Wilton RFC
The premier club of Hawick was Hawick and Wilton RFC. This was formed by the Hawick and Wilton Cricket Club members as a sport to play in the winter. It ran the Hawick and Wilton Sevens; the fourth oldest rugby sevens tournament in the world (behind Melrose [1883]; Gala [April 1884] and Selkirk Cricket Club [May 1884]). For the members of Hawick and Wilton RFC however cricket came first and this led to the splinter club of Hawick RFC forming in 1885. Hawick and Wilton RFC continued on after Hawick RFC formed as rivals; and for a time both the Hawick and Wilton Sevens and the later Hawick Sevens co-existed. Hawick and Wilton RFC eventually folded in 1890 as its members decided to purely focus on cricket.

Establishment of the club
1885 saw some rugby players of Hawick and Wilton RFC found a new club to instead solely concentrate on rugby: the Hawick Football Club, moving to new premises at the Volunteer Park, just beyond the cricket pitch. New colours were adopted, dark green jerseys and stockings with white shorts, and in 1886 Hawick was admitted to membership of the Scottish Football (later Rugby) Union, only the 19th club to be admitted, the only earlier Border clubs being Gala and Melrose RFC.

In 1888 Hawick Football Club moved to its present home, Mansfield Park, at the other end of the town. The early seasons brought keenly contested games against Edinburgh Academicals, Gala, and Watsonians, and in 1896 Hawick won their first Scottish Unofficial Championship.

1945 to 1972 – Scottish domination
Between 1945 and 1972, Hawick club firmly established among the leaders of Scottish rugby, winning the unofficial championship eight times, taking the Border League title fifteen times, and earning fame as sevens specialists.

In the 1950s, all 15 of Hawick RFC were approached by rugby league scouts from Yorkshire.

In this period, Hugh McLeod, George Stevenson, Adam Robson, and Derrick Grant alone won 100 international caps between them, while fifteen other Greens played for their country.

1972 onwards
The official Scottish championship began in season 1973–74 and since that time Hawick has won the championship on twelve occasions. The proud record of winning the first Border League in 1901–02 and the first Scottish championship in 1973–74 was added to in 1995–96 when the club were also first winners of the Scottish Cup. Indeed, in season 2002–03, the Greens completed the treble, winning Scottish League championship, Scottish Cup and Border League championship.

In 2009, the club was relegated to the second tier for the first time in their history. Hawick regained their place in the Premiership at the end of the 2012–13 season with a 39–38 playoff victory over Dundee HSFP.

Hawick Force
The club run a 2nd XV called Hawick Force, who play in the top Scottish Reserve League.

Forwards Coaches: Matthew Landels, Michael Robertson

Backs Coach: Wiaan Griebenow 

Team Manager: Kenny "Shovie" Colville

Honours
 Scottish Unofficial Championship
 Champions (10 + 4 shared): 1895–96, 1899-1900 (with Edinburgh Academicals and Edinburgh University), 1908-09 (with Watsonians), 1926–27, 1932-33 (with Dunfermline), 1948–49, 1954–55, 1959–60, 1960–61, 1963–64, 1964-65 (with West of Scotland), 1965–66, 1967–68, 1971–72
 Scottish Premiership 
 Champions (12): 1973–74, 1974–75, 1975–76, 1976–77, 1977–78, 1981–82, 1983–84, 1984–85, 1985–86, 1986–87, 2000–01, 2001–02, 2022–2023
 Scottish League Championship, second tier 
 Runners-Up (1): 2012–13
 Scottish Cup
 Champions (2): 1995–96, 2001–02
 Runners-Up (1): 2014–15
 Langholm Sevens
 Champions (29): 1909, 1911, 1912, 1913, 1914, 1922, 1923, 1927, 1932, 1946, 1955, 1956, 1958, 1961, 1962, 1966, 1973, 1976, 1977, 1980, 1982, 1984, 1985, 1991, 2000, 2004, 2009, 2012, 2015
 Melrose Sevens
 Champions (28): 1887, 1892, 1893, 1894, 1895, 1896, 1897, 1898, 1900, 1901,1908, 1909, 1910, 1911, 1912, 1913, 1919, 1922, 1924, 1925, 1927, 1929, 1933, 1946, 1953, 1955, 1966, 1967
 Hawick Sevens
 Champions (49):  1886, 1887, 1888, 1892, 1894, 1895, 1898, 1900, 1902, 1903, 1904, 1909, 1911, 1912, 1921, 1924, 1927, 1930, 1932, 1933, 1948, 1951, 1953, 1955, 1957,1961, 1963, 1964, 1966, 1968, 1970, 1971, 1976, 1977, 1979, 1983, 1984, 1986, 1988, 1998, 2000, 2008, 2009, 2010, 2011, 2012, 2013, 2015, 2016
 Hawick hold the record for most consecutive victories (6): 2008, 2009, 2010, 2011, 2012, 2013
 Gala Sevens
 Champions (42): 1893, 1894, 1895, 1896, 1897, 1898, 1900, 1901, 1902, 1903, 1904, 1906, 1909, 1910, 1911, 1912, 1923, 1924, 1926, 1927, 1928, 1931, 1932, 1933, 1935, 1940, 1946, 1947, 1949, 1956, 1958, 1959, 1960, 1961, 1966, 1967, 1968, 1978, 1979, 1986, 1992, 2007
 Hawick hold the record for most consecutive victories (6): 1893, 1894, 1895, 1896, 1897, 1898
 Jed-Forest Sevens
 Champions (28): 1894, 1895, 1896, 1897, 1898, 1912, 1919, 1923, 1924, 1927, 1928, 1929, 1931, 1949, 1953, 1954, 1957, 1960, 1961, 1966, 1968, 1972, 1976, 1977, 1981, 1988, 1991, 2009
 Peebles Sevens
 Champions (1): 1926
 Kelso Sevens
 Champions (15): 1923, 1925, 1929, 1935, 1945, 1951, 1958, 1959, 1960, 1962, 1963, 1965, 1966, 1967, 1968
 Earlston Sevens
 Champions (12): 1925, 1926, 1946, 1948, 1956, 1961, 1962, 1963, 1966, 1967, 1969, 1970
 Selkirk Sevens
 Champions (15): 1919, 1924, 1927, 1930, 1933, 1939, 1953, 1954, 1957, 1959, 1966, 1967, 1969, 1981, 1986
 Walkerburn Sevens
 Champions (3): 1998, 2000, 2007
 Hawick Linden Sevens
 Champions (1): 2019 (won by Hawick Force)
 Hawick and Wilton Sevens
 Champions (3): 1886, 1887, 1888

Notable players

Hawick RFC have already seen 58 players represent Scotland.

 Adam Robson (22)
 Alan Tomes
 Alan Tomes (48)
 Alex Fiddes
 Alex Laidlaw (1)
 Alister Campbell (15)
 Andrew Broatch
 Anthony Little
 Brian Hegarty
 Cameron Murray (26)
 Colin Deans (52)
 Colin Telfer (17)
 Darcy Graham
 Dave Callam
 Dave Valentine
 Derek Turnbull (15)
 Derrick Grant (14)
 Derrick Patterson
 Doug Davies
 Douglas Jackson
 Drew Turnbull
 Eric Milligan
 George Stevenson (24)
 Gregor Hunter
 Hugh McLeod (40)
 Ivan Laing
 Jerry Foster
 Jim Renwick (52)
 Jock Beattie (23)
 John Hegarty
 John Houston
 Lana Skeldon
 Lisa Thomson
 Nikki Walker (24) 
 Norman Pender
 Oliver Grant
 Robert Scott
 Rob Valentine
 Rob Welsh (2)
 Rory Sutherland
 Scott Forrest
 Scott MacLeod (23) 
 Stuart Hogg
 Thomas Wright
 Tom Scott
 Tom Scott
 Tony Stanger (52)
 Walter Sutherland,(13) "Wattie Suddie"
 Willie Kyle (21)
 Willie Welsh (21)

1888 British Isles tourists
Three Hawick players took part in the 1888 British Lions tour to New Zealand and Australia
 Bob Burnet Forward
 Willie Burnet Half-back
 Alex Laing Forward

Other famous players
The famous rugby commentator Bill McLaren also played for Hawick.

See also
 Border League
 Borders Sevens Circuit
 Hawick Harlequins RFC

References

Bibliography

 
 Bath, Richard (ed.) The Scotland Rugby Miscellany (Vision Sports Publishing Ltd, 2007 )
 Godwin, Terry Complete Who's Who of International Rugby (Cassell, 1987)
 Jones, J.R. Encyclopedia of Rugby Union Football (Robert Hale, London, 1976 )
 Massie, Allan A Portrait of Scottish Rugby (Polygon, Edinburgh)

External links
 Hawick RFC Official Site

Scottish rugby union teams
Rugby union clubs in the Scottish Borders
Rugby clubs established in 1873
1873 establishments in Scotland
Hawick